This is a list of winners and nominees of the Primetime Emmy Award for Outstanding Music Composition for a Limited or Anthology Series, Movie or Special.

Starting in 2019, the category recognizes scripted programs. Unscripted programs compete for Music Composition for a Documentary Series or Special.

Winners and nominations

1950s

Note: The award presented in 1955 was for "Best Original Music Composed for TV"

1960s

Note: Award titled Outstanding Achievement in Original Music Composed for Television 1962–64

1970s

1980s

1990s

2000s

2010s

2020s

Notes

Programs with multiple nominations

4 nominations
 Fargo

3 nominations
 Sherlock

2 nominations
 American Horror Story
 Black Mirror
 Masada Philip K. Dick's Electric Dreams''

Composers with multiple awards

6 awards
 Bruce Broughton (3 consecutive)

5 awards
 Laurence Rosenthal (3 consecutive)

4 awards
 Jerry Goldsmith (2 consecutive)

2 awards
 Jeff Beal (consecutive)
 Leonard Rosenman
 Patrick Williams

Composers with multiple nominations

11 nominations
 Bruce Broughton

10 nominations
 Billy Goldenberg

8 nominations
 Laurence Rosenthal
 Patrick Williams

6 nominations
 Jeff Beal
 Allyn Ferguson
 Lee Holdridge

5 nominations
 Jerry Goldsmith
 Fred Karlin
 Jeff Russo
 David Shire
 Mark Snow
 Ernest Troost

4 nominations
 David Arnold
 Robert Lane

3 nominations
 Richard Bellis
 Don Davis
 Johnny Mandel
 Peter Matz
 Michael Price
 Pete Rugolo
 John Williams

2 nominations
 John Addison
 John Altman
 Nathan Barr
 John Barry
 Robert Russell Bennett
 Charles Bernstein
 Chris Boardman
 Todd Boekelheide
 Kris Bowers
 Sean Callery
 Joseph Conlan
 Normand Corbeil
 Mychael Danna
 Dick DeBenedictis
 James Di Pasquale
 Gerald Fried
 Richard Hartley
 John Kander
 Michel Legrand
 John Lunn
 Rob Mathes
 Gian-Carlo Menotti
 Lennie Niehaus
 Alex North
 Mac Quayle
 Martin Phipps
 Rachel Portman
 Carlos Rafael Rivera
 Leonard Rosenman
 Lawrence Shragge
 Harry Sukman
 Cristobal Tapia de Veer
 Brian Tyler
 Alex Wurman
 Christopher Young
 Victor Young
 Geoff Zanelli
 Marcelo Zarvos

References

Film music awards
Music Composition for a Limited or Anthology Series, Movie or Special